KMMS-FM (94.7 MHz, "The Moose 94.7") is a radio station licensed to serve Bozeman, Montana.  The station is owned by Townsquare Media, licensed to Townsquare License, LLC. It airs an Adult Album Alternative music format.

All Townsquare Media Bozeman studios are located at 125 West Mendenhall Street, downtown Bozeman. KXLB, KMMS-FM, KZMY, and KISN all share a transmitter site on Green Mountain, east of Bozeman.

The station was assigned the KMMS-FM call letters by the Federal Communications Commission on May 15, 1991.

After 30 years on the 95.1 frequency, KMMS moved to 94.7 FM at 12pm MT on May 28, 2020.

Ownership
In February 2008, Colorado-based GAPWEST Broadcasting completed the acquisition of 57 radio stations in 13 markets in the Pacific Northwest-Rocky Mountain region from Clear Channel Communications.  The deal, valued at a reported $74 million, included six Bozeman stations, seven in Missoula and five in Billings. Other stations in the deal are located in Shelby, Montana, and in Casper and Cheyenne, Wyoming, plus Pocatello and Twin Falls, Idaho, and Yakima, Washington.  GapWest was folded into Townsquare Media on August 13, 2010.

History
KMMS started out as KUUB 95 the Kube, Yellowstone Country's hit music.  It was Bozemans home of the original American Top 40.  In 1991, the station flipped to a hybrid Rock/Alternative/Adult Rock format.  This left Bozeman without a pop music station for ten years until KSCY (KISN) Started transitioning from Adult Contemporary to top 40 in 2002.

Previous logo

Translators

References

External links
KMMS-FM official website

MMS-FM
Adult album alternative radio stations in the United States
Gallatin County, Montana
Radio stations established in 1987
1987 establishments in Montana
Townsquare Media radio stations